One Atlantic Center, also known as IBM Tower, is a skyscraper located in Midtown Atlanta, Georgia. It is the third tallest building in Atlanta.

History
It was completed in 1987 and remained the tallest building in Atlanta until 1992, when it was surpassed by the Bank of America Plaza, which was built on the northern edge of Downtown adjacent to Midtown. It was also the tallest building in the southeastern U.S. at the time of completion, surpassing the Southeast Financial Center in Miami.

Design
The building was commissioned by Prentiss Properties as a southeastern headquarters for IBM, a company responsible for many notable skyscrapers of the 1980s.  Aside from introducing Atlanta to the postmodern architectural idiom of the 80s, this tower is notable for essentially creating what is now the Midtown commercial district.  Located at the then-remote corner of 14th and West Peachtree Street over a mile from Downtown, this building nevertheless opened nearly fully occupied and thus attracted developers to Midtown.

Architecture
The design of the building was influenced by the Tribune Tower in Chicago, which is most evident in the base of the building as well as the main body. The building's exterior is clad in pink Spanish granite and culminates in a copper pyramidal top with a gold peak. The design includes gothic flourishes, most noticeably below the copper top of the building. At night the peak and ridges along the top are illuminated brightly, creating a glowing effect.

Other phases
It was joined in 2001 by the much shorter Regions Plaza building, which bears similar postmodern design and was constructed across the street as the second phase of the Atlantic Center development.  Atlantic Center Plaza's design and architecture are so similar, it has affectionately become known in Atlanta as the "Mini Me" building, named after the comical dwarfish clone of Dr. Evil in the Austin Powers movies.

Development
One Atlantic Center was designed by Johnson/Burgee Architects. As associate architect, Heery International, Inc. produced the contract documents.  Both Atlantic Center Towers were constructed by HCBeck, now known as The Beck Group.

Major Tenants
 Alston & Bird
 RSM Global
 Carlton Fields
 Bryan Cave
 DLA Piper
 Duff & Phelps
 Korn Ferry International
 Equifax
 JAMS
 FTI Consulting
 KPMG

See also
List of tallest buildings in Atlanta
 List of tallest buildings in the United States

References

External links
 One Atlantic Center official website
 One Atlantic Center at Hines Interests Limited Partnership

Skyscraper office buildings in Atlanta
Midtown Atlanta
Office buildings completed in 1987
IBM facilities
Philip Johnson buildings
Postmodern architecture in the United States
John Burgee buildings
Hines Interests Limited Partnership